Tochikistoni Ozod was a political party in Tajikistan founded in 1998 and based in Uzbekistan. It was designated as a terrorist organization in 2007 by the Supreme Court of Tajikistan.

According to the government of Tajikistan, the party is made up of anti-constitutional forces. It is led by Mahmud Khudoyberdiyev.

Together with three other minority parties, they petitioned the government to combat widespread repression of opposition parties.

References

Political parties in Tajikistan
Political parties in Uzbekistan
Banned political parties
Organizations based in Asia designated as terrorist